Traces is the third solo studio album by the American singer and songwriter Steve Perry. It was released on October 5, 2018, by Fantasy Records. It was his first solo album in 24 years, after For the Love of Strange Medicine in 1994, his first appearance on a studio album since his last appearance with Journey on their 1996 album Trial by Fire and his first release of new music since his contributions to the 1998 film Quest for Camelot.

It is Perry's first solo top 10 Billboard album, and his first top 40 album in the UK as a solo artist.

Background
After leaving Journey in 1998, Perry withdrew from the music industry (apart from a handful of low-key guest appearances over the years) for "many reasons, but mainly my love for music had suddenly left me".<ref name="blabbermouth1">{{cite web|url=http://www.blabbermouth.net/news/former-journey-singer-steve-perry-releases-music-video-for-new-solo-single-no-erasin/ |title=Former Journey Singer Steve Perry Releases Music Video For New Solo Single, 'No Erasin |website=Blabbermouth |date=August 15, 2018 |accessdate=August 15, 2018}}</ref> His passion was reignited after his girlfriend, Kellie Nash, died from cancer in December 2012, and he began recording Traces in May 2015.

Release and promotion
The first single from the album, "No Erasin'", was released on August 14, 2018, accompanied by a performance music video. It peaked at number 18 on the US Adult Contemporary chart, number 38 on the Hot Rock Songs chart and number 17 on the Rock Digital Song Sales chart.

Two more performance videos were released, "No More Cryin'" on September 4, 2018, and "We're Still Here" on September 20, 2018. A second video for "We're Still Here", Perry's first "official" music video in 25 years, was released on March 22, 2019. The song peaked at number 14 on the Adult Contemporary chart in the week of April 27, 2019.

On September 24, 2018, Perry participated in a Facebook Live event at noon PDT. The 15-minute webcast focused on the making of the album.

On March 15, 2019, the expanded edition, which was previously exclusive to Target stores, was released worldwide.

On July 19, 2019, a remixed version of "Sun Shines Gray" was released as the fourth single from the album. On December 4, 2020, a remixed album of songs from Traces was released.

Critical reception
The album received a positive reception from critics. Andrew McNeice of Melodicrock rated the album a 92/100, calling it, "a very fine record", and that it is "Immaculately produced and constructed, with equally impressive musical performances by the band" and "soulful harmonies" by Perry.

CrypticRock.com gave the album 5/5 stars and called it, "All in all, Traces is a near flawless return for Steve Perry."Get Ready to Rock Me gave the album 4.5 out of 5 stars and said, "We never thought we'd get another full album from Steve Perry, thankfully we have in Traces'', which is a master class in AOR and soulful edged pop."

Track listing

Personnel

 Steve Perry – vocals (1–15), backing vocals (1–14), bass guitar (1–2, 4–6, 10, 13), guitar (1, 14), orchestra (4), orchestrations (2, 5, 7, 13), programming (2–3, 8–9, 13, 14), strings (1, 3, 6, 12), synthesizers (9, 12, 14), all instruments on "Blue Jays Fly"
 Dallas Kruse – electric piano (9), Hammond organ (4, 8, 9), piano (3, 5), strings (1), synthesizers (1, 5, 10, 12), vibraphone (12)
 Thom Flowers – guitar (1–10)
 Vinnie Colaiuta – drums (2–4, 7–9, 11, 13)
 Devin Hoffman – bass guitar (1, 2, 4, 6, 14), guitar (13, 14)
 Tommy King – Hammond organ (1, 7, 12), piano (1, 7, 12)
 Paula Hochhalter – cello (2, 5, 7, 11)
 Steve Richards – cello (2, 3, 5, 7)
 David Campbell – orchestrations (2, 5, 7)
 Michele Richards – violin (2, 5, 7)
 Charlie Bisharat – violin (2, 5, 7)
 Andrew Duckles – viola (2, 5, 7)
 Suzie Katayama – cello (2, 5, 7)
 Sara Parkins – violin (2, 5, 7)
 Luke Maurer – viola (2, 5, 7)
 Roger Joseph Manning Jr. – synthesizers (1, 3)
 Brian West – guitar (2), drums (2)
 Steve Ferrone – drums (12, 14)
 Pino Palladino – bass guitar (8, 9)
 Teag Reaves – horns (5, 7)
 Josh Freese – drums (1, 6)
 Nathan East – bass guitar (3, 12)
 Dylan Hart – horns (5, 7)
 The Steve Perry Philharmonic Orchestra (4)
 Katie Hampton – backing vocals (12)
 Aubrey Logan – backing vocals (12)
 Sherree Brown – backing vocals (2)
 Booker T. Jones – Hammond organ (4)
 Kellie Nash – Love and Laughter (13)
 Lynn Mabry – backing vocals (2)
 Chuck Berghofer – rhythm bass guitar (11)
 The Patrick Willams Orchestra (11)
 Kyle Moorman – programming (6)
 Michael Sanford – guitar (14)
 Dan Greco – percussion (11)
 Douglas Tornquist – tuba (7)
 Randy Goodrum – piano (3)
 Tim Eckert – arco bass (11)
 Ralph Morrison – violin (11)
 Harry Shirinian – viola (11)
 Scott Hosfeld – viola (11)
 David Spreng – guitar (1)
 Rodney Wirtz – viola (11)
 Travis Carlton – bass guitar (7)
 Alisha Bauer – cello (11)
 Tom Ranier – piano (11)
 Al Schmitt – strings (11)
 Matt Cooker – cello (11)
 Ray Tischer – viola (11)
 Tim Pierce – guitar (12)
 Jeff Babko – piano (10)
 Dan Wilson – guitar (4)
 Tina Soule – cello (11)
 John 5 – guitar (6)

Production
Produced by Steve Perry
Co-produced by Thom Flowers
Recorded and mixed by Thom Flowers and Steve Perry
Recorded at Love Box, Capitol Studios, and East West
Mastered by Bob Ludwig at Gateway Mastering, Portland, Maine
Cover artwork by Jeff Wack
Cover design and concept by Steve Perry and Jeff Wack
Photos by Emma Holley, Myriam Santos, Steve Perry and Thom Flowers

Charts

Weekly charts

Year-end charts

References

2018 albums
Steve Perry albums
Fantasy Records albums